Hazera Khatun (born 31 July 1947) is a Bangladeshi politician. She served as a member of the Jatiyo Sangshad from 2014 through 2018. She held one of the 50 reserved seats for women and represented the Workers Party of Bangladesh.

Background
Khatun is a civil servant by profession.

References

Living people
1947 births
Workers Party of Bangladesh politicians
10th Jatiya Sangsad members
Bangladeshi communists
Place of birth missing (living people)
Women members of the Jatiya Sangsad
21st-century Bangladeshi women politicians